David William McFadden (October 11, 1940 – June 6, 2018) was a Canadian poet, fiction writer, and travel writer.

Biography
McFadden was born in Hamilton, Ontario, and began writing poetry while still in high school, publishing in literary magazines, corresponding with beat writer Jack Kerouac, and becoming a proofreader for the Hamilton Spectator newspaper. As he gained success as a poet he quit the newspaper devoting himself full-time to literature in 1976.

McFadden served on the editorial board of Coach House Press, and as a contributing editor for SwiftCurrent and Canadian Art Magazine.  He was a monthly columnist for Quill and Quire and Hamilton This Month. He taught at David Thompson University Centre for three years and was a member of the production team of the literary journal Brick.

McFadden's poetry critiques the commercialism and shallowness of modern society. His work, with its overt humour, reflections on contemporary urban life, and interest in the mistakes of the imagination is influenced by Frank O'Hara, John Ashbery and the New York School of the 1950s, as well as the Beat writers of the 1960s such as Allen Ginsberg and Lawrence Ferlinghetti. His work focuses on Canadian subjects, settings and personalities. His book of 100 Baudelaire-inspired prose poems, Gypsy Guitar, was called "everyone's favourite book of poems" by George Bowering.

McFadden is a founding member of GOSH (Gentlemen of Sensible Height), and a former member of International PEN, the Writer's Union of Canada, the League of Canadian Poets, and the Last Minute Club.

In 2012, McFadden was diagnosed with logopenic variant primary progressive aphasia, a type of Alzheimer’s disease that affects a person’s memory of words, and shortly thereafter he became one of the first participants in a study of the effects of aerobic exercise on people already affected by dementia.

Works

Poetry
The Poem Poem – 1967
Letters from the Earth to the Earth – 1968
Poems Worth Knowing – 1971
Intense Pleasure – 1972
The Ova Yogas – 1972
The Poet's Progress – 1977
The Saladmaker – 1977
I Don't Know – 1978
A Knight in Dried Plums – 1978
On the Road Again – 1978
A New Romance – 1979
My Body Was Eaten By Dogs – 1981
Country of the Open Heart – 1982
Three Stories and Ten Poems – 1982
A Pair of Baby Lambs – 1983
The Art of Darkness – 1984 (nominated for a Governor General's Award)
Gypsy Guitar – 1987 (nominated for a Governor General's Award)
Anonymity Suite – 1992
There'll Be Another – 1995
Five Star Planet – 2002
Why Are You So Sad? Selected Poems of David W. McFadden – 2007 (shortlisted for the 2008 Canadian Griffin Poetry Prize)
Be Calm, Honey – 2008 (shortlisted for the 2009 Governor General's Award in Poetry)
Why Are You So Long & Sweet? Collected Long Poems of David W. McFadden – 2009
What's the Score? – 2012 (winner of the 2013 Canadian Griffin Poetry Prize)

Fiction
The Great Canadian Sonnet – 1974
Animal Spirits – 1983
Canadian Sunset – 1986

Travel
A Trip Around Lake Huron – 1980
A Trip Around Lake Erie – 1980
A Trip Around Lake Ontario – 1988
An Innocent in Ireland – 1995
Great Lakes Suite – 1997
An Innocent in Scotland – 1999
An Innocent in Newfoundland – 2003
An Innocent in Cuba – 2003

References

External links 
 Griffin Poetry Prize biography
 Griffin Poetry Prize reading, including video clip
 Seeing our city through the eyes of a poet in the Hamilton Spectator
 Man of verse finds spotlight a curse in the Toronto Star
 David McFadden entry in The Canadian Encyclopedia
 Canadian Poetry Online: David McFadden – Biography and six poems (Eight Medical Students, Xavier Simpático and His Old Church, Havana All Night Long, One-Legged Man in Shorts, Dreamland Cuba, The Death of Greg Curnoe, Nuclear Physicist Seeks New Home)
 

1940 births
2018 deaths
20th-century Canadian poets
20th-century Canadian male writers
Canadian male poets
Writers from Hamilton, Ontario